Bishopric of Trier may refer to:
 The historic Electorate of Trier, an ecclesiastical principality of the Holy Roman Empire that existed from the end of the 9th to the early 19th century
 The modern Roman Catholic Diocese of Trier